Roll Wagons Roll is a 1940 American Western film directed by Albert Herman and starring Tex Ritter, Nelson McDowell and Muriel Evans.

Plot

Cast

References

Bibliography
 Bond, Johnny. The Tex Ritter Story. Chappell Music Company, 1976.

External links
 

1940 films
1940 Western (genre) films
American Western (genre) films
Films directed by Albert Herman
Monogram Pictures films
1940s English-language films
1940s American films